Suigam was a village in Vav Taluka of Banaskantha district in Gujarat, India, but it is now a Taluka of Banaskantha district in Gujarat.

History
It was under Palanpur Agency of Bombay Presidency, which in 1925 became the Banas Kantha Agency. After Independence of India in 1947, Bombay Presidency was reorganized in Bombay State. When Gujarat state was formed in 1960 from Bombay State, it fell under Banaskantha district of Gujarat.

Geography
It is situated on a small hill six miles from the Rann of Kutch. It is the starting point of one of the routes across the Ran to Parkar.

References

Notes

Bibliography
 

 This article incorporates text from a publication now in the public domain: 

Villages in Banaskantha district